Maria Patrascu (born January 19, 1997) is a Romanian-born Canadian professional tennis player.

Patrascu has won two doubles titles on the ITF Circuit in her career. In June 2016, she reached her best singles ranking of world No. 819. On October 27, 2014, she peaked at No. 647 in the doubles rankings.

Patrascu made her WTA Tour debut at the 2014 Coupe Banque Nationale, having received a wildcard with Ayan Broomfield into the doubles tournament.

ITF Circuit finals

Doubles: 2 (2 titles)

Head-to-head-records

Record against top 100 players
Patrascu's win–loss record against players who were ranked world No. 100 or higher when played is as follows:
  Elena Vesnina 0–1
* statistics as of July 24, 2016

References

External links
 
 

1997 births
Living people
Canadian female tennis players
Romanian emigrants to Canada
Tennis players from Bucharest
Tennis players from Toronto